Sagittaria ambigua, the Kansas arrowhead, is an aquatic plant species native to the central United States (Indiana, Illinois, Arkansas, Missouri, Kansas and Oklahoma). It grows in wet areas, mostly along the shores of ponds and waterways.

References

External links
Photo of herbarium specimen at the Missouri Botanical Garden,  Sagittaria ambigua, collected in Missouri
Altervista flora Italiana, Kansas arrowhead - Sagittaria ambigua
Oklahoma Biological Survey, Wetland and Aquatic Plants of Oklahoma

ambigua
Flora of the United States
Freshwater plants
Plants described in 1894